Novoderbenovsky is a rural locality (a khutor) in Sysoyevskoye Rural Settlement, Surovikinsky District, Volgograd Oblast, Russia. The population was 373 as of 2010. There are 6 streets.

Geography 
Novoderbenovsky is located 15 km southwest of Surovikino (the district's administrative centre) by road. Staroderbenovsky is the nearest rural locality.

References 

Rural localities in Surovikinsky District